The 2000–01 season is JS Kabylie's 36th season in the Algerian top flight, They will be competing in National 1, the Algerian Cup and the CAF Cup.

Squad list
Players and squad numbers last updated on 1 September 2000.Note: Flags indicate national team as has been defined under FIFA eligibility rules. Players may hold more than one non-FIFA nationality.

(B) – CR Belouizdad B player

Competitions

Overview

{| class="wikitable" style="text-align: center"
|-
!rowspan=2|Competition
!colspan=8|Record
!rowspan=2|Started round
!rowspan=2|Final position / round
!rowspan=2|First match	
!rowspan=2|Last match
|-
!
!
!
!
!
!
!
!
|-
| National

|  
| 3rd
| 7 September 2000
| 27 June 2001
|-
| Algerian Cup

| colspan=2|Round of 64
| colspan=2|5 February 2001
|-
| 2000 CAF Cup

| Quarter-finals
| style="background:gold;"|Finals
| 4 August 2000
| 1 December 2000
|-
| 2001 CAF Cup

| colspan=2|Second round
| 11 May 2001
| 26 May 2001
|-
! Total

National

League table

Results summary

Results by round

Matches

Algerian Cup

2000 CAF Cup

Quarter-finals

Semi-finals

Final

2001 CAF Cup

Second round

Squad information

Playing statistics

|-

|-
! colspan=12 style=background:#dcdcdc; text-align:center| Players transferred out during the season

Goalscorers
Includes all competitive matches. The list is sorted alphabetically by surname when total goals are equal.

Notes

References

JS Kabylie seasons
JS Kabylie